USS Tisdale has been the name of more than one United States Navy ship, and may refer to:

 USS Tisdale (DE-278), a destroyer escort transferred to the United Kingdom in 1943 upon completion which served in the Royal Navy as the frigate  from 1943 to 1946
 , a destroyer escort in commission from 1943 to 1945
 , a guided missile frigate in commission from 1982 to 1996

United States Navy ship names